Angelo Massarelli (1510–1566) was the Roman Catholic bishop of Bishop of Telese o Cerreto Sannita (1557–1566). He is best known for keeping the Acts of the Council of Trent, which were the minutes of the council, and published only 300 years after the council was held.

References

External links and additional sources
 (Chronology of Bishops) 
 (Chronology of Bishops) 

16th-century Italian Roman Catholic bishops
Bishops appointed by Pope Paul IV
1510 births
1566 deaths
Bishops in Campania
Participants in the Council of Trent